Jasmin is a given name, a variant of Jasmine, and is the common form in Germany and Finland. In German, Finnish, and English-speaking countries it is feminine, whereas in Slovenia, Croatia, Bosnia and Herzegovina, Serbia, Montenegro, and Macedonia it is masculine - the feminine variant in these countries is Jasmina. There are other variations and ways of spelling this name, such as: Yasmin, Jasminko, etc. for masculine variant, and Yasmina, Jasminka, etc. for feminine.

People named Jasmin
 Jasmin Burić (born 1987), Bosnian goalkeeper
 Jasmin Darznik (born 1973), Iranian–American writer
 Jasmin Farid (born 1992), Swedish politician
 Jasmin Handanović (born 1978), Slovenian goalkeeper
 Jasmin Hutter (born 1978), Swiss politician
 Jasmin Mozaffari, Canadian film director and screenwriter
 Jasmin Ouschan (born 1986), Austrian pool player 
 Jasmin Schornberg (born 1986), German canoeist
 Jasmin Schwiers (born 1982), German actress
 Jasmin Wagner (born 1980), German pop singer, actress and model
 Jasmin Wöhr (born 1980), German tennis player

See also
Jasmina
Jasmine (given name)